The Zoelae were an ancient Celtic tribe of Gallaecia, living in the north of modern Portugal, in the province of Trás-os-Montes, between the mountains of Serra da Nogueira and the mountains of Mogadouro.

See also
 Pre-Roman peoples of the Iberian Peninsula

External links
 Detailed map of the Pre-Roman Peoples of Iberia (around 200 BC)

Tribes of Gallaecia
Ancient peoples of Portugal